Siedlisko  is a village on the Oder river in Nowa Sól County, Lubusz Voivodeship, in western Poland. It is the seat of the gmina (administrative district) called Gmina Siedlisko.

The castle of Sedlischo was first mentioned in a 1298 deed, when the Silesian duke Henry III of Głogów acquired it from the castellans at Bytom Odrzański. After the Duchy of Głogów had become a Bohemian fief in 1331, it was seized by the royal House of Luxembourg, who enfeoffed several noble families with Siedlisko. In 1561 the lordship passed to Fabian von Schoenaich, whose nephew Georg had the Renaissance Carolath Castle built and received the title of a Freiherr (Baron) from Emperor Rudolf II of Habsburg. In 1697 the Schoenaich possessions around Carolath and Bytom Odrzański were raised to the status of a Bohemian state country by decree of Emperor Leopold I of Habsburg.

The Schoenaichs retained their estates even after the annexation of Silesia by King Frederick II of Prussia in 1742. Freiherr Hans Carl, a devoted Protestant, immediately paid homage to the new ruler and in turn received the title of a Prince of Carolath-Beuthen. The castle burnt down after the Red Army had occupied the area at the end of World War II. A Renaissance gate building and a mausoleum designed by Hans Poelzig in 1912 are preserved.

Notable people
 Georg von Schoenaich (1557–1619), German humanist
 Hans Carl zu Carolath-Beuthen (1688–1763), German nobleman 
 Johann Carl Friedrich zu Carolath-Beuthen (1716–1791), German nobleman and prussian general
 Ignaz Aurelius Fessler (1756-1839), Hungarian cleric, stayed at Carolath as an educator 1790/91
 Wolfgang Fischer (11 December 1888 – 1 February 1943), German general
 Georg August Pritzel (1815 – 1874), German librarian

References

Villages in Nowa Sól County